Onychipodia flavithorax is a moth of the  subfamily Arctiinae. It was described by Rothschild in 1912. It is found in Angola.

References

Endemic fauna of Angola
Lithosiini
Moths described in 1912